Chernitsyno is a rural locality and the administrative center of Chernitsynsky Selsoviet Rural Settlement, Oktyabrsky District, Kursk Oblast, Russia. Population:

Geography 
The village is located on the Seym River (a left tributary of the Desna), 75 km from the Russia–Ukraine border, 11 km south-west of Kursk, at the еаstern border of the district center – the urban-type settlement Pryamitsyno.

 Streets
There are the following streets in the locality: Burovaya, Geologicheskaya, Listyanka, Magistralnaya, Naberezhnaya, Nadezhdy, Oktyabrskaya, Oktyabrsky pereulok, Pushkarka, Sportivnaya, Svetlaya, Shirokaya, Tsentralnaya, Tsukanovka and Verkhnyaya Naberezhnaya (1039 houses).

 Climate
Chernitsyno has a warm-summer humid continental climate (Dfb in the Köppen climate classification).

Transport 
Chernitsyno is located 5 km from the federal route  Crimea Highway (a part of the European route ), on the road of regional importance  (Kursk – Lgov – Rylsk – border with Ukraine), on the road of intermunicipal significance  (Pryamitsyno – Asphalt plant of Oktyabrsky District – Chernitsyno), 1.5 km from the nearest railway station Dyakonovo (railway line Lgov I — Kursk).

The rural locality is situated 23 km from Kursk Vostochny Airport, 118 km from Belgorod International Airport and 225 km from Voronezh Peter the Great Airport.

References

Notes

Sources

Rural localities in Oktyabrsky District, Kursk Oblast